Osman Owlan (also Romanized as ‘Os̄mān Owlan and ‘Os̄mān Ūlan) is a village in Chaharduli Rural District, Keshavarz District, Shahin Dezh County, West Azerbaijan Province, Iran. At the 2006 census, its population was 93, in 16 families.

References 

Populated places in Shahin Dezh County